"Loud Places" is a song by English electronic music producer Jamie xx, with featured vocals from Romy Madley Croft of the xx. It was released as a single on 27 March 2015. A music video for the song was released on the same day through YouTube. The song peaked at number 55 on the French Singles Chart and number 62 on the UK Singles Chart.

Composition
Tracks from In Colour spans across different years in Smith's life, with "Gosh" and "Loud Places" representing where he was at the moment. The chorus sampled American jazz drummer Idris Muhammad's 1977 song "Could Heaven Ever Be like This". This use of sample was said by Thumps Angus Harrison as "particularly poignant" when Muhammad's death was less than a year before.

Release
On 25 March 2015, Smith premiered "Gosh" and "Loud Places" on Annie Mac's BBC Radio 1 show.

Music video
The official music video for "Loud Places", lasting five minutes and four seconds, was uploaded onto Jamie xx's YouTube channel on 27 March 2015. It was directed by Simon Halsall with JB Babenhausen and produced by Craig Dixon.

In the video, Smith and Croft can be seen riding skateboards while getting covered in confetti. Smith shared: “Before we made music together, from the age of like 13, Romy and I used to go out and skate."

Track listing
 Young Turks — YT141

Charts

Certifications

Release history

References

2015 singles
2015 songs
Songs written by Jamie xx
Songs written by Rick Nowels
Jamie xx songs
Young Turks (record label) singles